Robert Jay Brady (November 8, 1922 – April 22, 1996) was an American professional baseball player and a former Major League catcher. He appeared in four total games played over two seasons with the 1946–47 Boston Braves, and spent 13 seasons (1940–52) in minor league baseball.

Brady made seven plate appearances in the big leagues, and collected one hit and one base on balls. His hit—a pinch single—came on September 8, 1946, against Tommy Hughes of the Philadelphia Phillies at Braves Field in the second game of a doubleheader.  Hughes pitched a 4–0 shutout victory against Boston.

One thing many people did not know was that at a young age Brady suffered from a bout of Scarlet Fever robbing him of his hearing in his left ear and minimal hearing in his right. Brady,  along  with  his  team,  had  an  outstanding  1940  campaign  as  the  Panthers  went  9 – 1  under  coach  Jay  M.  Riden. A  2 – 0  loss  to  Juniata  Joint  was  the  only  blemish  of  the  season. In  10  games,  Bob  had  17  hits  in  38  at – bats  for  a  .447  average. He  drove – in  10  runs  and  scored  nine. The  left – handed  hitter  also  stroked  four  doubles  and  had  three  triples. He  played  mostly  first  base  but  also  saw  time  in  the  outfield  and  caught  in  one  game. On  August 24, 1946  Bob  played  in  his  first  major  league  game  for  the  Boston  Braves,  now  known  as  the  Atlanta  Braves. Brady  appeared  in  two  more  games  that  season,  going  1 – for – 5  at  the  plate. He  also  drew  a  walk. In  1947  Brady  appeared  in  just  one  game,  that  coming  on  April  17,  going  hitless  in  just  one  at – bat.

During  his  professional  career  Brady  was  pretty  much  a  catcher,  spending  12  seasons  in  the  minors  mostly  on  the  AAA  level. In  1944,  his  second  with  the  Hartford  Chiefs  of  the  old  Eastern  League,  his  team  won  the  league  championship  and  he  was  the  league’s  all – star  catcher. He  also  saw  time  with  Minneapolis  of  the  American  Association  League  where  in  one  game  he  hit  three  home  runs  against  Toledo.

Brady suffered a stroke in 1996 and passed in a matter of months.

Brady lived most of his life in Manchester, Connecticut, married to Virginia K. Brady.  He loved fishing and playing golf.  He had one child, a daughter, named Patricia.

References

External links

1922 births
1996 deaths
Allentown Wings players
Baseball players from Pennsylvania
Boston Braves players
Bridgeport Bees players
Dallas Eagles players
Greeneville Burley Cubs players
Hartford Bees players
Hartford Laurels players
Indianapolis Indians players
Major League Baseball catchers
Milwaukee Brewers (minor league) players
Minneapolis Millers (baseball) players
Nashville Vols players
Sportspeople from Manchester, Connecticut
Sioux City Soos players
Syracuse Chiefs players
Welch Miners players
York Bees players